Fat Albert and the Cosby Kids aired 110 episodes during its run on CBS from September 9, 1972 to October 24, 1981 and later in syndication from September 1, 1984 to August 10, 1985.

Series overview

Episodes

Season 1 (1972)

Season 2 (1973)

Season 3 (1975)

Season 4 (1976)

Season 5 (1979); now The New Fat Albert Show

Season 6 (1980)

Season 7 (1982)

Season 8 (1984–85); now The Adventures of Fat Albert and the Cosby Kids (first-run syndication)

Specials

Lists of American children's animated television series episodes